Big Brother (Hungarian: Nagy Testvér)  is a reality show on TV2. It was the Hungarian version of the original Dutch Big Brother series by Endemol in 1999.

The show originally broadcast between 2002 and 2003, in which a number of contestants live in an isolated house trying to avoid being evicted by the public with the aim of winning a large cash prize at the end of the run.

The hosts of the show were Claudia Liptai & Attila Till.

Series overview

Big Brother 1 
12 housemates walked into the Big Brother house on September 1, 2002, but only 3 of them could participate in the final on December 21, 2002. Housemates had to pass weekly tasks. They also had to take care of pigs and a cat that was named "Jánoska" by Pongó.

Évi won 16.000.000 Ft.

Nominations Table

Big Brother VIP 1 
The first season of Nagy Testver VIP consisted of eight celebrities competing for the title of the winner of Big Brother. The first season of Nagy Testver VIP aired from January 5, 2003 to January 10, 2003. Throughout the duration of the first season viewers were voting for a winner while the celebrities competed in a series of task while living in the house. Ultimately, Gabor Bochkor is believed to have won the season on day 6. The proceeds from all votes cast during this season went to charity.

Big Brother VIP 2 
The first season of Nagy Testver VIP consisted of eight celebrities competing for the title of the winner of Big Brother. The second season of Nagy Testver VIP started just two days after the final of the first and aired from January 12, 2003 to January 17, 2003. Throughout the duration of the second season viewers were voting for a winner while the celebrities competed in a series of task while living in the house. The winner, who was decided on day 6 of this season, is Lajos Boros.

Big Brother VIP 3 
The third and final season of Nagy Testver VIP consisted of eight celebrities competing for the title of the winner of Big Brother. The third season of Nagy Testver VIP started just two days after the final of the second and aired from January 19, 2003 to January 23, 2003. Throughout the duration of the third season viewers were voting for a winner while the celebrities competed in a series of task while living in the house. Ultimately, it was Zolee Ganxsta who was declared the winner of this season on day 5.

Big Brother 2 
14 housemates walked into the Big Brother house on February 2, 2003, but only 4 could participate in the finale on May 30, 2003. There are two major commercial television stations in Hungary. One is TV2, the other is RTL Klub. RTL Klub began airing its second season of their own reality show called ValóVilág earlier than TV2 its Big Brother 2. While most fans of BB1 started watching ValóVilág 2, its viewing ratings got better. Big Brother 2 suffered a popularity breakdown, TV2 decided to air the daily episodes at late night. After finishing this bad rated season, rumours stated that there would be a third season of Big Brother because TV2 made a contract for three seasons. However, Big Brother 3 never aired.

Zsófi won 20.000.000 Ft.

Nominations Table

Hungarian television shows
Hungary
2002 Hungarian television series debuts
2000s Hungarian television series
Hungarian reality television series
TV2 (Hungarian TV channel) original programming